Cambojiida is an order of ctenophores belonging to the class Tentaculata. The order contains a single family, Cambojiidae.

Genus:
Cambodgia Dawydoff, 1946

References

Tentaculata
Animal families